Gappaz (also known as Kalāteh-ye Gabāz) is a village in Safiabad Rural District, Bam and Safiabad District, Esfarayen County, North Khorasan Province, Iran. At the 2006 census, its population was 157, in 34 families.

References 

Populated places in Esfarayen County